The Handbook of Texas is a comprehensive encyclopedia of geography, history, and historical persons of Texas, published by the Texas State Historical Association (TSHA).

History
The original Handbook was the brainchild of TSHA President Walter Prescott Webb of The University of Texas history department. It was published as a two-volume set in 1952, with a supplemental volume published in 1976.

In 1996, the New Handbook of Texas was published, expanding the encyclopedia to six volumes and over 23,000 articles.

In 1999, the Handbook of Texas Online went live with the complete text of the print edition, all corrections incorporated into the handbook's second printing, and about 400 articles not included in the print edition due to space limitations. The handbook continues to be updated online, and contains over 25,000 articles. The online version includes entries on general topics, such as "Texas Since World War II", biographies such as notable Texans Samuel Houston and W. D. Twichell, ranches such as the Matador, and geographical entries such as "Waco, Texas".

See also 

 Texas State Historical Association

References

External links
 
 1952 two-volume edition at HathiTrust

1952 non-fiction books
1996 non-fiction books
American encyclopedias
American online encyclopedias
Encyclopedias of culture and ethnicity
Encyclopedias of history
Encyclopedias of literature
Texas
Texas culture
Texas literature